

Hans Voigt (21 February 1896 – 26 April 1969) was a highly decorated Generalmajor in the Wehrmacht during World War II. He was also a recipient of the Knight's Cross of the Iron Cross.

Awards and decorations
 Iron Cross (1914)
 2nd Class
 1st Class
 Honour Cross of the World War 1914/1918
 Wehrmacht Long Service Award 4th to 1st Class
 Iron Cross (1939)
 2nd Class
 1st Class
 Knight's Cross of the Iron Cross on 28 April 1945 as Generalmajor and commander of fortress Arnswalde (Pommern)

Notes

References

Citations

Bibliography

 
 

1896 births
1969 deaths
Military personnel from Hanover
Major generals of the German Army (Wehrmacht)
German Army personnel of World War I
Recipients of the clasp to the Iron Cross, 1st class
Recipients of the Knight's Cross of the Iron Cross
German prisoners of war in World War II
People from the Province of Hanover
German Army generals of World War II